Niels Kristensen (born 12 December 1920) is a Danish rower. He competed at the 1952 Summer Olympics in Helsinki with the men's coxed four where they were eliminated in the semi-final repêchage.

References

External links
  

1920 births
Possibly living people
People from Ikast-Brande Municipality
Danish male rowers
Olympic rowers of Denmark
Rowers at the 1952 Summer Olympics
European Rowing Championships medalists
Sportspeople from the Central Denmark Region